The Roma Alliance of Macedonia is a political party that held one seat in the Assembly of North Macedonia in the parliament of 2016-2020. It represents the Romani people in North Macedonia.

References

External links 

 Official website

2013 establishments in the Republic of Macedonia
Political parties established in 2013
Political parties of minorities in North Macedonia
Macedonian Romani people
Romani political parties